Machu Kunturi (Quechua machu old, old person, Aymara kunturi condor, "old condor", Hispanicized spelling Macho Condori) or Pampachuku (Pampachuco) is a mountain in the Andes of Peru, about  high. It is located in the Puno Region, Lampa Province, Ocuviri District. Machu Kunturiri lies between the mountain Pichaqani in the west and Qillqa in the east.

References

Mountains of Peru
Mountains of Puno Region